COPIM (Community-led Open Publication Infrastructures for Monographs) is an international project funded by Research England and Arcadia Fund. 

Following the principle of 'Scaling Small', the project aims to build not-for-profit community-owned, open infrastructures to enable open access book publishing to prosper.

COPIM has been named as a Supporting Action in UKRI's 2020 Open Access Review Consultation.

Work Packages 
In seven distinct Work Packages, the project explores:

 how to scope and build support for an integration of open access books in libraries;
 how to build a collective of librarians, publishers and researchers invested in sustainable OA through a not-for-profit, community-governed OA book revenue management and information exchange platform;
 how to establish funding models that enable a transition of legacy publishers' existing business models to non-BPC OA;
 research on, and implementation of robust governance models for not-for-profit, community-owned digital infrastructures such as those being developed in other work packages;
 channels of OA book discovery and dissemination, culminating in the development of an open-source OA book metadata creation and dissemination system and service;
 how to establish more robust ways to tackle the technical and legal impediments to a more streamlined process of archiving and preservation of OA books technical and legal solutions.

Opening the Future 
Opening the Future, a revenue model developed in COPIM's Work Package 3, is a collective subscription model through which subscribing libraries can get unlimited access to a selection of a chosen publisher's backlist, with perpetual access after three years. The generated membership revenue is used by the publisher solely to produce new Open access monographs. 

The model is currently being piloted in collaboration with CEU Press and Liverpool University Press.

Thoth 
Thoth is an Open source metadata management and distribution platform developed by COPIM's Dissemination Work Package. Thoth is specifically tailored to tackle issues of getting Open access (OA) works into the book supply chain. It is being built with openness in mind: its source code is open, its data is exposed via open APIs and all its outputs are released under a CC0 license.

Thoth’s main goals are:

 To lower the entry barrier to good metadata management and practices for small/medium OA publishers who are currently struggling to produce their metadata to all the various different specifications that each distributing platform requires;
 To help distribute open access books, which have been systematically excluded from a book supply chain that was created for closed books;
 To expose quality and first-hand metadata, using industry standards, publicly for anyone to consume.

References 

Publishing